Suí was a Zhou dynasty vassal state in the Han River Basin in modern Suizhou, Hubei, China. Its ruling house had the surname Ji (姬), and held the noble rank of Hou (侯), roughly comparable to a marquess.

History
During the initial stages of the Spring and Autumn Period from 771 BCE, the power of Sui's neighbor the State of Chu grew considerably. At the same time Sui also expanded and became leader of the various vassal states whose leaders bore the surname Ji known as the Hanyang Ji Vassals (汉阳诸姬).

The Zuo Zhuan records that in 706 BCE King Wu of Chu invaded the State of Sui on the grounds that the state's minister Ji Liang (季梁) had halted the king's army. Not long afterwards, the Sui military commander received Chu Prime Minister Dou Bobi (鬬伯比) who concluded that given the opportunity Sui would conspire against Chu. Two years later in the summer of 704 BCE following Sui's non-appearance at a meeting of the vassal states called at Shenlu (沈鹿), King Wu of Chu personally led his army in an attack on Sui. Thereafter Sui was defeated at the Battle of Suqi (速杞之战). The state's leader fled whilst Chu minister Dou Dan (鬬丹) captured the Marquess of Sui's chariot along with the chariot division military commander. However, at that time Chu did not have sufficient power to annex Sui and peace followed in the same year.

In 690 BCE King Wu died in the course of an expedition into Sui at a time when the latter state wanted peace. Over the following decades, Chu gradually annexed Hanyang Ji Vassals in every direction. In 640 BCE the vassals attacked Chu with Sui as their leader but were defeated and entered into peace talks.

By the time of the Battle of Chengpu in 632 BCE, the State of Jin had held talks with all the Hanyang Ji Vassals. Sui was reduced to the status of Chu vassal, no longer independent and not qualified to attend meetings of the vassal states.

The Chu capital at Ying suffered an attack by the State of Wu in 506 BCE whereupon King Zhao of Chu fled to Sui. Although under pressure from Wu, Sui would not hand over King Zhao and protected him well. For this reason Sui was rewarded by Chu. For the year 494 BCE the Spring and Autumn Annals records: "The Prince of Chu, the Marquess of Chen and the Marquess of Sui attacked the State of Cai". Based on the History of Lu section of the same book later author Du Yu believed that Chu restored Sui's independence as a marquessate in return for their protection of King Zhao.

At some unknown later date, Sui was finally annexed by Chu.

Connection between Sui and Zeng
The tomb of the Marquess of Zeng (曾侯) excavated in Sui County, Hubei in 1978 uncovered a large quantity of well-preserved relics in an area that was always believed to be part of Sui's territory. This led to a discussion on the relationship between Sui and Zeng with historian Li Xueqin publishing an article in the Guangming Daily on October 4, 1978, entitled “The Riddle of the State of Zeng” (曾国之谜). In this article he writes that the states of Sui and Zeng were actually the same place although there are many other theories including Zeng conquering Sui, Sui overthrowing Zeng and Chu overthrowing Zeng and moving its location to Sui.

However, in January 2013, a late Spring and Autumn period, early Warring States Period bronze halberd (ge) belonging to the chancellor of the Sui state, inscribed with the text "随大司马献有之行戈," was uncovered during excavations in a Zeng state tomb complex in Suizhou. This is an extremely important discovery for researchers studying the relationship between the Sui and Zeng states, in addition to a large bronze bell detailing inter-state relations between Chu, Wu and Zeng, when corresponding written records state Chu, Wu and Sui. Among other artifacts discovered were Western Zhou period bronzes detailing the founding of the Zeng State by descendants of Nangong Kuo, enfeoffed in Suizhou to pacify the local Huaiyi tribes.

See also
Marquis of Sui's pearl

References

Ancient Chinese states
Zhou dynasty